The 2016–17 season was Zob Ahan Football Club's 16th season in the Iran Pro League, and their 21st consecutive season in the top division of Iranian football. They also competed in the Hazfi Cup and AFC Champions League, and had their 46nd year in existence as a football club.

Players

First-team squad
As of 15 May 2017.

Iran Pro League squad
As of 19 January 2016

Transfers
Confirmed transfers 2016–17

Summer

In:

Out:

Winter

In:

Out:

Competitions

Overview

Iran Pro League

Standings

Results summary

Results by round

Matches

AFC Champions League

Group C

Hazfi Cup

Matches

Round of 32

Last 16

Quarter-final

Semi-final (1/2 Final – Last 4)

Final

Statistics

Appearances 

|}

Top scorers
Includes all competitive matches. The list is sorted by shirt number when total goals are equal.

Last updated on 30 May 2016

Friendlies and pre-season goals are not recognized as competitive match goals.

Disciplinary record
Includes all competitive matches. Players with 1 card or more included only.

Last updated on 30 May 2016

Goals conceded 
 Updated on 30 May 2016

Own goals 
 Updated on 5 January 2016

Club

Coaching staff

Other information

See also

 2015–16 Persian Gulf Pro League
 2015–16 Hazfi Cup
 2016 AFC Champions League

Notes

References

External links
Iran Premier League Statistics
Persian League

2016-17
Iranian football clubs 2016–17 season